The Grass Arena is an autobiography that was made into a British film released in 1991.  It is based on the true story of John Healy. The book had been out of print for a number of years, but was re-issued on 31 July 2008.

Storyline
Raised in a religious family with an abusive father, young Johnny soon learns that he has to learn to defend himself. He takes up boxing, but soon falls victim to alcoholism. His boxing career over, John takes to the "Grass Arena", parks where he lives with other alcoholics. His life descends into an horrific journey of homeless alcoholism and the associated lifestyle of crime and jail and danger. Amongst other events, he describes being given the drug Antabuse in a clinical trial of some kind.

In jail a fellow inmate teaches him chess and he demonstrates an extraordinary ability at the game. He is soon beating grandmasters and having his games published in newspapers. Thus he is redeemed by the game.  Healy is played by Mark Rylance in the film, which also features Pete Postlethwaite.

Releases

The BBC film adaptation was released on DVD by Simply Media in 2018.

References

External links

James, Erwin 'Saved by the book' - Interview with John Healy  The Guardian, 5 August 2008.
TheGrassArena.net A fan website dedicated to the book

British biographical drama films
1991 films
1990s biographical drama films
Autobiographies adapted into films
Films about chess
Films directed by Gillies MacKinnon
Biographical films about sportspeople
Cultural depictions of Irish men
Cultural depictions of chess players
1991 drama films
Films based on autobiographies
1990s English-language films
1990s British films